Mahara McKay (born 20 March 1981 in New Zealand) is a former Swiss model, DJ and music producer , yoga teacher & studio owner. In 2000, she won the beauty pageant Miss Switzerland. Today, she travels the world  teaching at Tantra festivals, Healing, Dance and Yoga Festivals, sharing transformative "Tantra Energy" workshops and intensive trainings for anyone ready for change, truth and love.

Life

Short biography 
Mahara McKay has a Swiss mother and a father from New Zealand of Maori descent. She grew up in New Zealand until she was ten years old. In 1991, she moved to Switzerland. After mandatory school, McKay attended art school and started an apprenticeship as an interior decorator in the city of Zurich, Switzerland.

In 2000, McKay won the beauty pageant Miss Switzerland. After her term as Miss Switzerland, McKay worked independently as a model, presenter, DJ and music producer. In this period, she also lived some time in Los Angeles and Berlin until she moved back to New Zealand in 2014, where she opened two yoga studios in Dunedin called 2nd Floor Yoga. There she facilitated Tantric Hatha, Yin Yoga, Pregnancy Yoga, Meditation, Pranayama, Yoga Nidra and Ecstatic Dances. However the longing to go deeper into Tantra and work more with deeper healing practices in Tantric and Shamanic Arts.

Career in the music industry 
Starting in 2002, McKay worked as a DJ at different events. She produced several songs for compilations such as the chill-out compilation Café del Mar. Starting with a focus on chill out music, McKay added different music genres to her palette over the years. From 2006 onwards, McKay also used the pseudonym DJ Rocksy under which she worked at different open-air festivals as well as skate, surf and snowboard events. Based on her success as a DJ, McKay was chosen to be the ambassador of Quiksilver Women in 2009. Consequently, she worked at different Quiksilver events as DJ. Apart from this, she opened several shows, such as, The X-Games, Pro France, King of the Groms, Roxy Chicken, as well as the 2009 Tony Hawk Show at the Grand Palais in Paris, France. Her music style was a mixture of different genres. McKay worked as a DJ in various cities in and around Switzerland as well as in New York, Los Angeles, Beijing, Singapore and Tunis.

Career in the fashion business 
Since her term as Miss Switzerland, McKay worked regularly as a photo and runway model for different Swiss and international brands, such as, Swarovski, Coca-Cola, Beldona (Swiss lingerie store), and Vögele Shoes (Swiss shoe brand). In 2005, she became the Swiss ambassador of the car manufacturer Ford which named a Ford Fiesta car series after her, the “Mahara Edition”. McKay was also the ambassador of other international as well as Swiss brands, such as, Onitsuka Tiger (2002–2009), Eve Cardinal (Swiss brewery, 2007–2011), Quiksilver Women (2009–2012), Walterli Freaks (Swiss fashion store), Dove Chocolate (2006–2008) and Harley Davidson (2009–2011).

Besides her engagement as a fashion model, McKay organised different fashion shows, produced photo shootings, and worked as a stylist on set. For over ten years, McKay designed most of her red carpet gowns herself. In 2011, she was chosen to be one of the designers of the contestants’ evening dresses at the Miss Switzerland pageant.

Discography

Compilations 
2001: Moana I - My selection (Universal Music 2001)
2003: Moana II - My selection (Universal Music 2003)
2004: More Moana Dreams (TBA Music 2004)

Singles 
Written & composed/produced:

2005: One Life, Sampler Café del Mar Vol. 12
2005: Feel Free, Sampler La Maison de l'Elephant Vol. 3
2005: Feel Free, Sampler Bolero Lifestyle Club
2006: Waterlove, SoundOasis List Vol. 1
2007: Soulsmooth, Sampler Café del Mar Vol. 14
2009: He's Looking At You, Science Fiction Jazz Vol. 12
2010: Trust Me, EVE of the Cardinal Summer Session CD
2010: Ko Tahi Te Oranga, EVE of the Cardinal Summer Session CD
2010: Shake It, EVE Cardinal Summer Session CD
2011: Beautiful Day, Sampler Café del Mar Vol. 17
2012: Tiger Beer, for the Swiss/German film Draussen ist Sommer (Klang der Stille AT)
2013: Holes In My Pockets

External links 
 maharamckay.info (official website)
 www.youtube.com/user/mahara808 (YouTube)

References 

1981 births
Living people
Miss Switzerland winners
Miss Universe 2001 contestants
Miss World 2000 delegates
New Zealand emigrants to Switzerland
New Zealand people of Swiss descent
Swiss DJs
Swiss female models
Swiss people of Māori descent